Giovanni Grazioli (Robbio, 9 March 1959) is an Italian sprinter.

His best result at the international individual level was the 5th place, in the 60 metres final, at the 1978 European Athletics Indoor Championships held in Milan.

Biography
He is the husband of former Italian hurdlers Simona Parmiggiani, and the coach of Italian sprinter Diego Marani.

Achievements

National titles
2 wins in 60 metres at the Italian Athletics Indoor Championships (1982, 1983)

References

External links
 Giovanni Grazioli at The-Sports.org

1959 births
Italian male sprinters
Living people
Italian athletics coaches
Mediterranean Games gold medalists for Italy
Athletes (track and field) at the 1979 Mediterranean Games
Universiade medalists in athletics (track and field)
Mediterranean Games medalists in athletics
Universiade gold medalists for Italy
Medalists at the 1979 Summer Universiade
People from Robbio
Sportspeople from the Province of Pavia
20th-century Italian people